Today is the second studio album from Angela Aki. This album was released in two different versions. A limited edition CD+DVD version and a CD only version. It has topped the Oricon Top 200 Weekly chart and has so far sold over 200,000 copies.

Track listing

Promotional Performances
 09/14 - Music Station (Again)

Release history

References 

2006 albums
Angela Aki albums
Albums produced by Seiji Kameda
Sony Music Entertainment Japan albums